Philippe Delerm (born November 27, 1950 in Auvers-sur-Oise, Val-d'Oise, France) is a French writer whose collection of essays La Première gorgée de bière et autres plaisirs minuscules sold more than one million copies in France.

Writing career

After a happy childhood with his teacher parents, Philippe Delerm pursued literary studies at Nanterre before becoming a teacher himself. In 1975, he married Martine Chosson, moved to Beaumont-le-Roger in Eure, and taught French Literature at the Marie Curie Collège (Secondary School) in Bernay. The first manuscripts which Delerm sent in from 1976 were refused by publishers.

In 1983, La Cinquième saison aroused interest in the author, and he won the 1990 Prix Alain-Fournier for his novel Autumn. He achieved his first major success in 1997 with the release of La Première gorgée de bière et autres plaisirs minuscules, a collection of 35 essays or meditations, each one or two pages in length, describing the joys that can be taken in the "insignificant things" that make up life. It was translated into English as The Small Pleasures of Life (also known as We Could Almost Eat Outside: An appreciation of life's small pleasures) by Sarah Hamp.

Delerm ended his teaching career in 2007 in order to concentrate on his writing full-time.

Sports journalism
As an amateur athlete in track & field, Delerm collaborated with the French sports newspaper L'Equipe for the 2004 Olympic Games in Athens, writing a daily piece for one of the track & field events. In August 2008, he was invited by France Television to be a commentator for track & field events at the Beijing Olympics.

He also covered the 2009 French Open.

Family
Delerm is married to children's book illustrator Martine Delerm, with whom he has one son, singer-songwriter Vincent Delerm.

Bibliography
 Dickens, barbe à papa et autres nourritures délectables
 Enregistrements pirates
 La Première gorgée de bière et autres plaisirs minuscules (The Small Pleasures of Life ; We Could Almost Eat Outside: An appreciation of life's small pleasures )
 La Cinquième saison
 Le Portique
 La Fille du Bouscat
 Il avait plu tout le dimanche
 Sortilège au muséum
 Sunborn ou Les Jours de lumière
 En pleine lucarne
 La Sieste assassinée
 Les Chemins nous inventent
 Mister Mouse ou La Métaphysique du terrier
 Autumn
 L'Envol
 Un Été pour mémoire
 Panier de fruits
 Le Buveur de temps
 Les Amoureux de l'hôtel de ville
 La Bulle de Tiepolo
 Elle s'appelait Marine
 Le Bonheur. Tableaux et bavardages
 Le Miroir de ma mère
 C'est bien
 Rouen
 C'est toujours bien
 À Garonne
 Paris l'instant
 La tranchée d'Arenberg et autres voluptés sportives
 Quelque chose en lui de Bartleby
 Et vous avez eu beau temps?

External links

  Critical bibliography (Auteurs.contemporain.info)

References
 Coverage of the 2009 French Open by Philippe Delerm

1950 births
Living people
People from Val-d'Oise
Prix des libraires winners
French male essayists
20th-century French novelists
21st-century French novelists
French male novelists
20th-century French essayists
21st-century French essayists
Prix Alain-Fournier winners
20th-century French male writers
21st-century French male writers